Archetypes is a podcast hosted by Meghan, Duchess of Sussex. The podcast debuted on August 23, 2022 and features Meghan talking with celebrities, historians and experts about the history of stereotypes that get leveled against women.

History 
In December 2020, it was reported that Prince Harry, Duke of Sussex and Meghan, Duchess of Sussex had signed a multi-year business deal with Spotify to launch a podcast through audio-producing company, Archewell Audio, a subsidiary of Archewell Inc. In January 2022, it was reported that Spotify had started efforts for expanding the couple's podcast team through "advertising for in-house staff" and hiring producers that would work with Archewell Audio via Gimlet Media. In March 2022 and amid "encouraging" conversations with Spotify on tackling misinformation, it was announced that Meghan's first podcast series would be launched in the summer of 2022. The podcast, titled Archetypes, includes a series of interviews with historians and experts to discuss the history of stereotypes that get leveled against women. In April 2022, it was reported that Meghan had filed an application to trademark the word "archetypes", which would prevent anyone else from using the word for "podcasts, audio programs and audio books".

Episodes

Reception 
Archetypes premiered in August 2022, and ranked first on Spotify's podcast charts in Australia, Canada, Ireland, the United Kingdom, and the United States within a few days.

Critical response 
The podcast's content received mixed reviews from critics. Writing for The Guardian, Sisonke Msimang believed there was not "much substance" to Meghan or her activism and her "message is perniciously deceptive. The love, happiness and triumph of which she speaks has primarily centred on her marriage." She described Meghan as "a rich out-of-touch woman" whose position "as a role model makes the road ahead feel that much harder for those of us trying to carve out lives that aren't defined by beauty, royalty, celebrity or wealth." Alyssa Rosenberg of The Washington Post believed that for Meghan and her husband "to build a truly new life, and have a wider impact on the causes they care about" the only way "is to stop making themselves the center of the story." In her review for The Independent, Olivia Petter described the podcast's first episode as "the most self-congratulatory 57 minutes of audio you'll hear all year." Petter also believed that Meghan's understanding of feminism "seems to be almost entirely about herself," and she was critical of her attempts to insert herself into the conversation: "What is being promoted as a subversive feminist podcast appears, so far, to be nothing more than an exercise in navel-gazing. One that is more about promoting its host than anyone else."

Meghan's comments in the first episode, in which she described the British High Commissioner's residence in South Africa as a "housing unit", were criticized in the media, resulting in the hashtag "VoetsekMeghan" (Go away Meghan) trending on Twitter. In the sixth episode, Meghan discussed how Deal or No Deal models had been treated like 'bimbos' and claimed there had been different beauty stations for the models to prepare for the game show, including a section where you could add "padding in your bra." Former Deal or No Deal model Patricia Kara disputed the claim, stating "There is no truth to the padding station. In all the years I worked on the show, that never existed." Both Patricia Kara and Donna Feldman criticized Meghan's statement that the models had been treated like bimbos.

Accolades 
Archetypes won "The Pop Podcast of 2022" at the 48th People's Choice Awards.

References

External links 
 
 Archetypes at Archewell
 

2022 podcast debuts
Audio podcasts
Interview podcasts
Meghan, Duchess of Sussex